Maniero is an Italian surname. Notable people with the surname include:

Felice Maniero (born 1954), Italian crime boss
Filippo Maniero (born 1972), Italian footballer
Luca Maniero (disambiguation), multiple people
Riccardo Maniero (born 1987), Italian footballer

Italian-language surnames